This is a list of the first women lawyer(s) and judge(s) in Kansas. It includes the year in which the women were admitted to practice law (in parentheses). Also included are women who achieved other distinctions such becoming the first in their state to graduate from law school or become a political figure.

Firsts in Kansas' history

Lawyers 

First female: Jennie Mitchell Kellogg (1880) 
First African American female: Lutie Lytle (1897) 
First Native American (Wyandot) female: Lyda Conley (1902)  
 First female to argue a case before the Supreme Court of Kansas: Nellie Cline Steenson

State judges 
 First female (probate court): Mary H. Cooper in 1908 
 First African American female: Jennifer L. Jones (1985) in 1992 
 First female (district court): Kay McFarland (1964) in 1973
 First female (Supreme Court of Kansas): Kay McFarland (1964) in 1977
 First female (Kansas Court of Appeals): Mary Beck Briscoe in 1984
 First female (Chief Justice; Supreme Court of Kansas): Kay McFarland (1964) in 1995 
 First female (Eleventh District of Kansas): Lori Bolton Fleming in 2012  
 First female (Ninth District of Kansas): Marilyn M. Wilder in 2015 
 First Hispanic American (female) (Kansas Court of Appeals): Rachel L. Pickering in 2022

Federal judges 
 First African American female (U.S. District Court for the District of Kansas): Julie A. Robinson (1981) in 2001

Attorney General of Kansas 

 First female: Carla Stovall from 1995-2003

Assistant Attorney General 

 First female: Jennie Mitchell Kellogg (1880) from 1891-1893

County Attorney 

 First female: Elfrieda Kenyon around 1939

Political Office 

Kathryn O’Loughlin McCarthy (1921): First female (a lawyer) to serve in Congress (1933-1935)
Sharice Davids (2010): First Native American (Ho-Chunk tribe) and openly-LGBT female (a lawyer) elected to Congress in Kansas (2018)

Kansas Bar Association 

 First female admitted: Marie Elizabeth Simpson Degeer Gilmore (1887) 
 First female president: Christel E. Marquardt from 1987-1988

Firsts in local history

 Lori Bolton Fleming: First female to become a Judge of the Eleventh District of Kansas (2012) [Cherokee, Crawford and Labette Counties, Kansas]
 Marilyn M. Wilder: First female appointed to the Kansas Judicial District No. 9 (2015) [Harvey and McPherson Counties, Kansas]
 Nanette L. Kemmerly-Weber: First female to serve as the County Attorney for Allen County, Kansas (1982)
 Lizzie S. Sheldon (1900): First female lawyer in Douglas County, Kansas
 Jean Shepherd: First female judge in Douglas County, Kansas (1984)
 Rebeca Mendoza: First Hispanic American female to graduate from the University of Kansas School of Law (1972) [Douglas County, Kansas]
 Christine Arguello (1980): First Hispanic American (female) to receive tenure at the University of Kansas School of Law
 Maritza Segarra: First female (and first Hispanic American female) judge in Geary County, Kansas (2004) and first Hispanic female appointed to a District Court in the State of Kansas (2007).
 Ida Tillotson (1881): First female lawyer in Graham County, Kansas
 Elfrieda Kenyon: First female to serve as the County Attorney for Hodgeman County, Kansas (c. 1939)
 Gwendolyn Van Derbur Falkenberg (1957): First female lawyer in Johnson County, Kansas
 Carolee Sauder Leek (1959): First female judge in Johnson County, Kansas (1965)
 Janette Sheldon: First female to serve as the President of the Johnson County Bar Association (1988)
 Rhonda Mason (1989): First African-American female judge in Johnson County, Kansas (2016)
 Beulah Wheeler (1925): First African American female lawyer in Leavenworth, Kansas [Leavenworth County, Kansas]
 Mary H. Cooper: First female probate judge in Beloit, Kansas (1908) [Mitchell County, Kansas]
 Sally Pokorny: First female to be elected as the County Attorney for Montgomery County, Kansas
 Thelma Helsper Boatman: First female to be elected as the County Attorney for Norton County, Kansas
 Shelley Depp (Greenwood) Bloomer: First female to serve as a County Attorney for Osborne County, Kansas (1975)
 Dorothy M. Jackson: First female district court judge in Lyons, Kansas (1922) [Rice County, Kansas]
 K. Seely Racine (1934): First female lawyer in Russell County, Kansas
 Nola Foulston: First female to serve as the District Attorney for Sedgwick County, Kansas (1988)
 Gloria Flentje: First female to serve as the President of the Wichita Bar Association (1991) [Sedgwick County, Kansas]
 Maxine Walker Wood: First female to serve as the County Attorney for Seward County, Kansas
 Jessie Nye: First female law graduate of the Washburn Law School (1912) [Shawnee County, Kansas]
 Kay McFarland (1964): First female elected to a judgeship in Shawnee County, Kansas (1971)
 Linda Diane Henry Elrod: First female to serve as the President of the Topeka Bar Association (1986) [Shawnee County, Kansas]
 Regina Victoria Mills Chambers (1900): First female lawyer in Sheridan County, Kansas
 LaVone Daily (1957): First female lawyer in Wyandotte County, Kansas
 Karen Shelor: First female to serve as the President of the Wyandotte County Bar Association (1986)
 Candice Alcaraz:  First African American female district court judge in Wyandotte County, Kansas (2022)

See also  

 List of first women lawyers and judges in the United States
 Timeline of women lawyers in the United States
 Women in law

Other topics of interest 

 List of first minority male lawyers and judges in the United States
 List of first minority male lawyers and judges in Kansas

References 

Lawyers, Kansas, first
Kansas, first
Women, Kansas, first
Women, Kansas, first
Women in Kansas
Lists of people from Kansas
Kansas lawyers